Lynne Greer Jolitz (born June 30, 1961) is a figure in free software and founder of many startups in Silicon Valley. Together with her husband William, she created 386BSD, the first open-source Unix-based operating system for personal computers to be distributed over the Internet.

Jolitz is also an author and authority on operating systems and networking issues. She is an internet news media commentator discussing events in the computer industry and wrote frequently for BYTE.

She also holds patents in internet technologies and semiconductor memory innovations, and writes technical papers and articles.

She is currently an adviser to CoolClip network, an internet startup that uses the server-based video production engine that Jolitz originally designed and tested at the University of California, Berkeley.

Jolitz has appeared on the Oracle E-Business Network and was presented with their Geek of the Week award for her years of work in high-speed networking and operating systems design. She also has appeared on Dvorak's RealComputing discussing the impact of Internet broadband.

She received an alumni award from the Physics Department at Berkeley for her work in alumni outreach with the department. She also is active in women's entrepreneur and technology networking groups and mentoring girls in science and technology.

She resides in Los Gatos, California.

References

External links
 
 Lynne's Take on Tech
 
 
 www.386bsd.org Information by William and Lynne Jolitz
 
 
 

1961 births
Free software programmers
BSD people
Living people
American women computer scientists
American computer scientists
University of California, Berkeley alumni
21st-century American women